The UUM-125 Sea Lance, known early in development as the Common ASW Standoff Weapon, was to be an American standoff anti-submarine missile, initially intended to carry a W89 thermonuclear warhead. It was conceived in 1980 as a successor to both the UUM-44 SUBROC and RUR-5 ASROC anti-submarine missiles. The Sea Lance was to be available in two versions, known as UUM-125A and RUM-125A. The former would be a submarine-launched version, the latter surface-launched. It was cancelled in 1990 as its importance was obviated by the collapse of the Soviet Union.

Design and development
In 1982, Boeing was awarded the main contract to develop the system, named the Sea Lance. By the following year, it had become apparent that developing two different versions of the missile was too ambitious, and further development of the RUM-125 was suspended. The RUM-139, a vertical-launch model of the ASROC, was developed as a stopgap weapon in this role.

The Sea Lance was to be housed inside a watertight capsule which could be launched from an ordinary 21 inch torpedo tube. The Mk 117 digital fire-control system provided targeting information to the missile prior to launch. After being fired, the capsule would float to the surface where the rocket would ignite and its fins would deploy. An inertial guidance system would direct the missile to the general location of the target. Initial plans were to have the surface-launched version operate in a similar manner: launched from the Mk 41 vertical launching system. When the missile reached the intended area, the payload would separate from the missile, then deploy a parachute to decelerate the warhead or torpedo. Both missiles were initially planned to carry a depth charge with a 200 kiloton W89 thermonuclear warhead. This massive warhead, combined with the fact that the target would be unable to detect the missile until the payload hit the water, made it virtually impossible for a target to escape.

In the mid-1980s, a conventional variant of this missile was proposed which would carry the new Mark 50 torpedo submarine-seeking weapon. This version was dubbed the UUM-125B.

A contract for the full-scale development of the Sea Lance was awarded in 1986. In 1988, it was decided to proceed again with the surface-launched RUM-125 version. The nuclear warhead was canceled in favor of a purely conventional missile.
In 1990, the entire program was canceled as a result of the collapse of the Soviet Union. Today the U.S. Navy attack submarines do not have any long-range supersonic stand-off anti-submarine weapon, while U.S. Navy surface warships do have the new, vertical-launch version of the ASROC.

Gallery

See also
 RUM-139 VL-ASROC
 RUR-5 ASROC
 UGM-89 Perseus
 UUM-44 SUBROC
 RPK-2 Vyuga

Suggested Reading

External links
 Directory of US Military missiles
 Global Security

Anti-submarine missiles of the United States
Ballistic missiles of the United States
Abandoned military rocket and missile projects of the United States